Kuseh Kahriz (also Romanized as Kūseh Kahrīz; also known as Kisa Kiagriz and Kūseh Kahrīzeh) is a village in Mokriyan-e Gharbi Rural District, in the Central District of Mahabad County, West Azerbaijan Province, Iran. At the 2006 census, its population was 1,875, in 328 families.

References 

Populated places in Mahabad County